The Battle of Varolampi Pond also known as the 'Sausage War' occurred during the Winter War and was a precursor to the Battle of Tolvajärvi.

Battle 
On the night of 10 December, the 718th Rifle Regiment of the Soviet army swung around the Finnish rear of the Tolvajärvi front and attacked the lightly defended Finnish supply and artillery troops at Varolampi Pond situated along the -Tolvajärvi road. 

The surprise attack saw initial success by the Soviet troops in advancing through the Finnish supply lines but failed to continue the assault towards Tolvajärvi village and the Finnish main-lines. The Soviet soldiers were exhausted and hungry after 5 days of forced marching and stopped to eat the sausage soup that the retreating Finns had left behind in their field kitchens. 

This gave enough time for Major Pajari, who happened to be along the Koriselkä road at the time, to muster enough soldiers from the 16th Infantry Regiment along with dispersed field cooks and medics to launch a counter-attack. 

Fighting lasted well into the night and involved close quarters combat and one of the only cases of bayonet fighting during the Winter War. By dawn on 11 December the counter-attack succeeded in driving back the Soviet force and inflicted heavy casualties, with over 100 dead Soviet troops left on the field according to Finnish estimates, along with 20 dead on the Finnish side.

See also 

 List of Finnish military equipment of World War II
 List of Soviet Union military equipment of World War II

References 

Battles and operations of the Winter War
Battles involving the Soviet Union